Michael Clamp (born 26 December 1961) is a former New Zealand rugby union player. A wing, Clamp represented Wellington at a provincial level, and was a member of the New Zealand national side, the All Blacks, in 1984 and 1985. He played 15 matches for the All Blacks including two official internationals.

Of Ngāti Toa Rangatira affiliation, Clamp played for New Zealand Māori between 1982 and 1988.

References

1961 births
Living people
Rugby union players from Lower Hutt
Ngāti Toa people
People educated at Hutt Valley High School
New Zealand rugby union players
New Zealand international rugby union players
Wellington rugby union players
Rugby union wings
Māori All Blacks players
Male rugby sevens players
Biarritz Olympique players
New Zealand expatriate rugby union players
Expatriate rugby union players in France
New Zealand expatriate sportspeople in France